Kuh-e Chuk Shakh is a mountain of the Hindu Kush mountain range in northeastern Afghanistan.

References

Mountains of Afghanistan
Landforms of Badakhshan Province
Five-thousanders of the Hindu Kush